Ann(e) Anderson may refer to:

Law and politics
 Anne Anderson (diplomat) (born 1952), 17th Ambassador of Ireland to the United States
 Anne Anderson (illustrator) (1874–1952), Scottish illustrator
 Ann Anderson (politician) (born 1952), American educator and politician
 Anne Anderson, plaintiff in Anderson v. Cryovac

Others
 Anne Anderson (researcher) (1937–1983), reproductive physiologist
 Anne Marie Anderson (born 1967), American sportscaster
 Ann Stewart Anderson (1935–2019), American artist
 Anne Anderson, ex-wife of Bert Convy (1933–1991)
 Ann Kiessling (born 1942), biologist, née Ann Anderson
 Ann Anderson, voice actor in Jin Jin and the Panda Patrol

See also 
 Anne Andersen (disambiguation)